Microtheca can mean:

Microtheca (alga), a genus of diatoms.
Microtheca (beetle), a genus of leaf beetles
Microtheca, a synonym for the orchid genus Cynorkis